La Paloma is a census-designated place (CDP) in Cameron County, Texas, United States. The population was 2,903 at the 2010 census, up from 354 at the 2000 census, when it was drawn to cover a much smaller area. It is part of the Brownsville–Harlingen Metropolitan Statistical Area. La Paloma means "the dove" in Spanish.

Geography
La Paloma is located in southwestern Cameron County at  (26.048605, -97.667017). It is less than one mile north of the Rio Grande, the Mexico–United States border.

Demographics
As of the census of 2010, there were 2,903 people, 93 households, and 83 families residing in the CDP. The population density was 1,371.4 people per square mile (525.7/km). There were 108 housing units at an average density of 418.4/sq mi (160.4/km). The racial makeup of the CDP was 38.14% White, 55.65% from other races, and 6.21% from two or more races. Hispanic or Latino of any race were 92.09% of the population.

There were 93 households, out of which 48.4% had children under the age of 18 living with them, 71.0% were married couples living together, 10.8% had a female householder with no husband present, and 9.7% were non-families. 7.5% of all households were made up of individuals, and 4.3% had someone living alone who was 65 years of age or older. The average household size was 3.81 and the average family size was 4.01.

In the CDP, the population was spread out, with 35.0% under the age of 18, 12.7% from 18 to 24, 26.6% from 25 to 44, 16.7% from 45 to 64, and 9.0% who were 65 years of age or older. The median age was 26 years. For every 100 females, there were 102.3 males. For every 100 females age 18 and over, there were 93.3 males.

The median income for a household in the CDP was $12,162, and the median income for a family was $12,162. Males had a median income of $11,912 versus $0 for females. The per capita income for the CDP was $5,354. About 54.8% of families and 65.2% of the population were below the poverty line, including 91.2% of those under age 18 and none of those age 65 or over.

Education
La Paloma is served by the San Benito Consolidated Independent School District.

In addition, South Texas Independent School District operates magnet schools that serve the community.

In popular culture
La Paloma is mentioned in the Hank Snow adaptation of the Geoff Mack song "I've Been Everywhere", which was later covered by more than 130 artists including Johnny Cash.

References

Census-designated places in Cameron County, Texas
Census-designated places in Texas